Ballet Memphis is a regionally and nationally recognized professional ballet company, founded in 1986 by Dorothy Gunther Pugh, and based in Memphis, Tennessee. Ballet Memphis regularly performs at their midtown home in an intimate performance space, at Playhouse on the Square, Germantown Performing Arts Center, Crosstown Theater and the Orpheum Theatre.

Ballet Memphis presents classical and mixed-repertory contemporary choreography.

The Ballet Memphis School offers ballet lessons for ages 3 through adult in a nurturing environment that encourages all students to reach their potential, discover the joy of movement, and appreciate the art of dance.

The current Ballet Memphis building was designed by archimania and opened to the public in 2017.

2022-2023 season 
Dracula choreography by Steven McMahon

Ballet Memphis' The Nutcracker

Winter Mix: Love Songs/Love Stories: Gerald Aprino's Birthday Variations, Marcus J. Willis' T&C's Apply, Garrett Ammon's Short Trip Home

Cinderella choreography by Steven McMahon

2021-2022 season 
In This Moment: Gabrielle Lamb's Elapse, Steven McMahon New Work, Mariana Oliveira's Pagliacci

Ballet Memphis' The Nutcracker

Winter Mix: George Balanchine's Concerto Barocco, Trey Mcintyre Patsy Cline Gets Her Heart Broken, Brandon Ramey New Work

Soul: Julie Niekrasz's In Search Of, Emilia Sandoval's In Mind’s Eye, Chanel DaSilva's Heathen Hearts

2019-2020 season 

Romeo and Juliet choreography by Steven McMahon at Playhouse on the Square

Ballet Memphis' The Nutcracker 

Winter Mix: New works with choreography by Crystal Michelle Perkins, Julie Marie Niekrasz and Uri Sands

Company Dancers 
Ballet Memphis consists of 18 professional dancers (as of 2022-2023 season)

 Iori Araya
 Angelina Broad
 Anwen Brown
 Cameron Cofrancesco
 Joey Dlearo
 Oscar Fernandez
 Eileen Frazer
 Andre Gallon
 Cecily Khuner
 Dominiq Luckie
 Phoebe Magna
 Beth Ann Maslinoff
 Darcy McLoughlin
 Wyatt Pendleton
 Brandon Ramey
 Virginia Pilgrim Ramey
 Emilia Sandoval
 Gretchen Vander Bloomer

See also
Culture of Memphis, Tennessee

References

External links
Ballet Memphis website

Ballet companies in the United States
Organizations based in Memphis, Tennessee
Non-profit organizations based in Tennessee
Culture of Memphis, Tennessee
Dance in Tennessee